

La Plata County

Lake County

Larimer County

Las Animas County

Lincoln County

Logan County

Mesa County

Mineral County

Moffat County

Montezuma County

Montrose County

Morgan County

Otero County

Ouray County

Park County

Phillips County

Pitkin County

Prowers County

Pueblo County

Rio Blanco County

Rio Grande County

Routt County

Saguache County

San Juan County

San Miguel County

Sedgwick County

Summit County

Teller County

Washington County

Weld County

Yuma County

References